Bestville is an unincorporated community in on the North Fork Salmon River in Siskiyou County, California, just downstream from Sawyers Bar.

History

Bestville, now in Siskiyou County was a California Gold Rush mining camp, first in Trinity County (one of the original counties of California, created in 1850 at the time of statehood). Then in the now defunct Klamath County from 1851 to 1874.  It was then within that part of Klamath County annexed to the Siskiyou County.

References

Settlements formerly in Klamath County, California
Unincorporated communities in Siskiyou County, California
Unincorporated communities in California